American singer-songwriter Oliver Tree has recorded songs for two studio albums, three extended plays (EP), and guest features. In 2013, Tree self-released the album Splitting Branches under his middle name and the EP Demons later the same year on Apollo Records. After signing to Atlantic Records in 2017, Tree released his debut major-label EP Alien Boy (2018), which was followed by the EP Do You Feel Me? in August 2019. The title track was a collaboration with Whethan, who had previously collaborated with Tree on the singles "When I'm Down", "All You Ever Talk About" and "Enemy", as well as co-writing many of his songs.

His debut studio album, Ugly Is Beautiful, was issued in July 2020 after being delayed due to the COVID-19 pandemic, with a deluxe version featuring the hit single "Life Goes On" released the following year. Musically, the album was described by critics as an electropop, hip-hop, pop-punk, and alternative rock effort. Despite claiming retirement, in September 2021 Tree released the collaborative EP Welcome to the Internet with Russian rave band Little Big. He announced his second studio album, Cowboy Tears, in November 2021.

Songs

See also
 Oliver Tree discography

Notes

References

Tree, Oliver